= Maurice Emile Borgeaud =

Italian European Space Agency personnel

Maurice Emile Borgeaud from the European Space Agency (ESA), Frascati, Rome, Italy was named Fellow of the Institute of Electrical and Electronics Engineers (IEEE) in 2013 for leadership in microwave remote sensing from spaceborne systems and retrieval of bio-physical and geo-physical parameters for land applications.
